Richard C. Kahn (January 26, 1897 in New Orleans, Louisiana - January 28, 1960 in Hollywood, California) was an American film director, screenwriter, and producer known for his B movies of the 1930s and early 1940s.  He often worked with an all-black cast. His feature films include Secret Menace (1931),  The Third Sex (1934), Two-Gun Man from Harlem (1938), The Bronze Buckaroo (1939), Harlem Rides the Range (1939), Son of Ingagi (1940),  Buzzy Rides the Range (1940), Buzzy and the Phantom Pinto (1941) and Guns Don't Argue (1957) (with Bill Karn). In 1955 he directed an episode of Grand Ole Opry, and in 1958 he directed two episodes of Sky King, "Rodeo Decathlon" and "The Brain and the Brawn".

He produced three Herbert Jeffrey films.

Selected filmography
 Secret Menace (1931)
 Son of Ingagi (1940)
 Buzzy Rides the Range (1940)
 Buzzy and the Phantom Pinto (1941)

References

American film directors
American male screenwriters
1897 births
1960 deaths
Writers from New Orleans
Screenwriters from Louisiana
20th-century American male writers
20th-century American screenwriters